Gordon Woodyard Tyrrell (born June 8, 1932) is a politician in the American state of Florida. He served in the Florida House of Representatives from November 5, 1968, to November 7, 1972, representing the 2nd district.

References

1932 births
Living people
Members of the Florida House of Representatives